Miłosz Bernatajtys (born 30 May 1982 in Słupsk) is a Polish rower. He won a silver medal in lightweight coxless four at the 2008 Summer Olympics.

For his sport achievements, he received: 
 Golden Cross of Merit in 2008.

References 

1982 births
Living people
Polish male rowers
Olympic rowers of Poland
Rowers at the 2008 Summer Olympics
Rowers at the 2012 Summer Olympics
Olympic silver medalists for Poland
Sportspeople from Słupsk
Olympic medalists in rowing
Polish people of Lithuanian descent
Medalists at the 2008 Summer Olympics
World Rowing Championships medalists for Poland
European Rowing Championships medalists